Sơn La is a province in the Northwest region of Vietnam. It borders Laos to the south. The province covers an area of 14,123.49 square kilometres and as of 2019 it had a population of 1,248,415. The population includes Black and White Tai ethnic group.

Sơn La Dam, the largest hydroelectric power station in Southeast Asia. is located in this province.

Administrative divisions
Sơn La is subdivided into 12 district-level sub-divisions and 204 commune-level sub-divisions:

See also
Nà Sản Airport
Mộc Châu plateau

References

External links 
 

 
Northwest (Vietnam)
Provinces of Vietnam